Ya'akov Ze'ev Latsky ("Bertoldi") (1881–1940) was a Jewish Ukrainian political and Yiddishist activist and briefly a Minister in the Ukrainian People's Republic in 1918.

First a member of Herut around 1901, he joined in December 1904 the new Zionist Socialist Workers Party to whose Central Committee he was elected in Odessa. He was closely associated with the theorist of Labour Zionism and leading advocate of Territorialist Zionism, Nachman Syrkin.

After the 1917 Revolution, he joined the Folkspartei. In April 1918, he was appointed Minister for Jewish Affairs in the Ukrainian People's Republic, replacing Fareynikte Moishe Zilberfarb. He was succeeded briefly by Solomon Goldelman, then in January 1919 by Abraham Revutzky of Poale Zion.

In October 1918, he was amongst the founders of an important Yiddish publishing house Folks-Farlag, initiated by intellectuals affiliated to the Folkspartei, like himself.

In 1920, he emigrated to Germany, where he continued searching for places to build a Jewish homeland. From 1923 to 1925 he traveled around the Jewish settlements in South America, about which he wrote a book, Einwanderung in di Yiddish Ishuwim in Dorem America (Immigration to the Jewish Communities of South America, 1926).

In 1925, he moved to Riga, where he published the daily Yiddish newspapers Dos Folk and Freemorgn. By the end of 1925 he had become disillusioned with Territorialism and switched to Zionism, immigrating to Eretz Yisrael. There, he became a member of Mapai and was deputy director of the Histadrut archives.

Notes

Sources

Bibliography

Yiddish: "Einwanderung in di Yiddish Ishuwim in Dorem America," 1926

1881 births
1940 deaths
Jews from the Russian Empire
Ukrainian Jews
Jewish ministers of Ukraine
Jewish activists
Politicians from Kyiv
People from Kiev Governorate
Folkspartei politicians
Zionist Socialist Workers Party politicians
Yiddish-language writers
Histadrut
Mapai politicians
Labor Zionists
Ashkenazi Jews in Mandatory Palestine